Paul Meng Zhuyou (born January 8, 1963) is a Chinese Catholic clergyman and Metropolitan Archbishop of the Roman Catholic Archdiocese of Taiyuan from 2013.

Biography
He was ordained a priest on June 29, 1991. He accepted the episcopacy with a papal mandate on September 16, 2010. On November 24, 2013, he became Archbishop of Taiyuan Metropolitan, replacing his predecessor Bishop Sylvester Li Jian-tang. His appointment was endorsed by the Holy See and the Chinese government.

References

1963 births
Living people
21st-century Roman Catholic bishops in China
Chinese bishops